Rodel Kurai Richards (born 5 September 2000) is an English professional footballer who plays as a forward for Vorskla Poltava.

Career
Richards started his career with Tottenham Hotspur before being released in the summer of 2021. The following year, he joined Bulgarian side Hebar but left the club without making an appearance. In October 2022, he joined Ukrainian side Vorskla Poltava on a three-year deal. On 19 October 2022, Richards made his professional debut in the Ukrainian Premier League as a late substitute in a 1–0 loss to Rukh Lviv.

References

External links
 
 

2000 births
Living people
English footballers
Footballers from Greater London
Association football forwards
Ukrainian Premier League players
Tottenham Hotspur F.C. players
FC Hebar Pazardzhik players
FC Vorskla Poltava players
English expatriate footballers
English expatriate sportspeople in Bulgaria
Expatriate footballers in Bulgaria
English expatriate sportspeople in Ukraine
Expatriate footballers in Ukraine